Croatia participated in the Eurovision Song Contest 2017 with the song "My Friend" written by Jacques Houdek, Tony Roberth Malm, Siniša Reljić, Arjana Kunštek, Ines Prajo and Fabrizio Laucella. The song was performed by Jacques Houdek, who was selected internally by the Croatian broadcaster Croatian Radiotelevision (HRT) on 17 February 2017 to represent Croatia at the 2017 contest in Kyiv, Ukraine. His song "My Friend" was presented to the public on 2 March 2017 during the radio programme Svijet diskografije broadcast on the HR 2 station.

Croatia was drawn to compete in the second semi-final of the Eurovision Song Contest which took place on 11 May 2017. Performing during the show in position 11, "My Friend" was announced among the top 10 entries of the second semi-final and therefore qualified to compete in the final on 13 May. It was later revealed that Croatia placed eighth out of the 18 participating countries in the semi-final with 141 points. In the final, Croatia performed in position 13 and placed thirteenth out of the 26 participating countries, scoring 128 points.

Background 

Prior to the 2017 contest, Croatia had participated in the Eurovision Song Contest twenty-two times since its first entry in 1993. The nation's best result in the contest was fourth, which it achieved on two occasions: in 1996 with the song "Sveta ljubav" performed by Maja Blagdan and in 1999 with the song "Marija Magdalena" performed by Doris Dragović. Following the introduction of semi-finals in 2004, Croatia had thus far featured in six finals. After the Croatian entries failed to qualify from the semi-finals between 2010 and 2013, Croatia managed to qualify to the final in 2016 with Nina Kraljić and the song "Lighthouse". 

The Croatian national broadcaster, Croatian Radiotelevision (HRT), broadcasts the event within Croatia and organises the selection process for the nation's entry. HRT confirmed Croatia's participation in the 2017 Eurovision Song Contest on 17 September 2016. Between 1993 and 2011, HRT organised the national final Dora in order to select the Croatian entry for the Eurovision Song Contest. In 2012 and 2013, the broadcaster opted to internally select the entry. The Croatian broadcaster continued the internal selection procedure in 2016 as well as in 2017 after missing the contest in 2014 and 2015.

Before Eurovision

Internal selection
On 17 February 2017, the Croatian national broadcaster HRT announced that it had internally selected Jacques Houdek to represent Croatia at the Eurovision Song Contest 2017. Jacques Houdek previously attempted to represent Croatia at the Eurovision Song Contest on several occasions: in 2002 with "Čarolija" placing thirteenth, in 2003 with "Na krilima ljubavi" placing fifth, in 2004 with "Nema razloga" placing fourth, in 2005 with "Nepobjediva" placing fourth, and in 2011 placing second. In regards to his selection as the Croatian entrant, Houdek stated: "I am extremely happy and thank Croatian Radio and Television for the trust they have shown. Being a representative of Croatia at the Eurovision Song Contest is a big honour for me and I'm grateful for the opportunity. I have been living for this for the past ten months, all of my artistic capabilities have been directed towards writing this song and I can barely wait for listeners to let it into their hearts."

The song that Houdek performed at the Eurovision Song Contest, "My Friend", was presented on 2 March 2017 during the radio programme Svijet diskografije broadcast on HR 2 and hosted by Zlatko Turkalj Turki. The song was written by Jacques Houdek himself, Tony Roberth Malm, Siniša Reljić, Arjana Kunštek, Ines Prajo and Fabrizio Laucella. Kunštek and Prajo were also the co-writers of "Ne brini", the Bosnian Eurovision Song Contest entry in 2003. In regards to his song, Houdek stated: "This is the song of my life and certainly the best thing I wrote so far. I'm happy that I have gathered such a great team of authors who have helped me to make the idea of the song come true and we believe that it will represent our homeland in the most beautiful light".

Preparation 
Following the presentation show, the preview video submitted for the Eurovision Song Contest by HRT for "My Friend" premiered, which was directed by Dario Lepoglavec and featured illustrations by Annamaria Gržetić and Deniss Grgić. In late March, Houdek filmed the music video for "My Friend", which was directed by Katja Restović. The music video was released to the public on 4 April.

At Eurovision 

According to Eurovision rules, all nations with the exceptions of the host country and the "Big Five" (France, Germany, Italy, Spain and the United Kingdom) are required to qualify from one of two semi-finals in order to compete for the final; the top ten countries from each semi-final progress to the final. The European Broadcasting Union (EBU) split up the competing countries into six different pots based on voting patterns from previous contests, with countries with favourable voting histories put into the same pot. On 31 January 2017, a special allocation draw was held which placed each country into one of the two semi-finals, as well as which half of the show they would perform in. Croatia was placed into the second semi-final, to be held on 11 May 2017, and was scheduled to perform in the second half of the show.

Once all the competing songs for the 2017 contest had been released, the running order for the semi-finals was decided by the shows' producers rather than through another draw, so that similar songs were not placed next to each other. Croatia was set to perform in position 12, following the entry from San Marino and before the entry from Norway. But after Russia was removed from the running order of the competition following their withdrawal from the contest, Croatia's position shifted to 11.

The two semi-finals and the final were broadcast in Croatia on HRT 1 with commentary by Duško Ćurlić. The three shows were also broadcast via radio on HR 2 with commentary by Zlatko Turkalj Turki. The Croatian spokesperson, who announced the top 12-point score awarded by the Croatian jury during the final, was Uršula Tolj.

Semi-final 

Jacques Houdek took part in technical rehearsals on 3 and 6 May, followed by dress rehearsals on 10 and 11 May. This included the jury show on 10 May where the professional juries of each country watched and voted on the competing entries.

The Croatian performance featured Jacques Houdek dressed in a black half-and-half costume including a suit and leather jacket, joined on stage by two instrumentalists and three backing vocalists dressed in black suits. Houdek's outfit was designed by Marco Falcioni. The LED screens transitioned from images of Houdek that turned to each side when his voice changed to a sunflower and rainbow backdrop. At the end of the song, the performers all came together. The performance also featured a pyrotechnic waterfall effect. The three backing vocalists that joined Houdek were: Alen Đuras, Edgar Rupena and Matija Cvek, while the two instrumentalists were violinist Antun Stašić and cellist Emanuel Pavon.

At the end of the show, Croatia was announced as having finished in the top 10 and subsequently qualifying for the grand final. It was later revealed that Croatia placed eighth in the semi-final, receiving a total of 141 points: 104 points from the televoting and 37 points from the juries.

Final 
Shortly after the second semi-final, a winners' press conference was held for the ten qualifying countries. As part of this press conference, the qualifying artists took part in a draw to determine which half of the grand final they would subsequently participate in. This draw was done in the reverse order the countries appeared in the semi-final running order. Croatia was drawn to compete in the first half. Following this draw, the shows' producers decided upon the running order of the final, as they had done for the semi-finals. Croatia was subsequently placed to perform in position 13, following the entry from Azerbaijan and before the entry from Australia.

Jacques Houdek once again took part in dress rehearsals on 12 and 13 May before the final, including the jury final where the professional juries cast their final votes before the live show. Jacques Houdek performed a repeat of his semi-final performance during the final on 13 May. Croatia placed thirteenth in the final, scoring 128 points: 103 points from the televoting and 25 points from the juries.

Voting 
Voting during the three shows involved each country awarding two sets of points from 1-8, 10 and 12: one from their professional jury and the other from televoting. Each nation's jury consisted of five music industry professionals who are citizens of the country they represent, with their names published before the contest to ensure transparency. This jury judged each entry based on: vocal capacity; the stage performance; the song's composition and originality; and the overall impression by the act. In addition, no member of a national jury was permitted to be related in any way to any of the competing acts in such a way that they cannot vote impartially and independently. The individual rankings of each jury member as well as the nation's televoting results were released shortly after the grand final.

Below is a breakdown of points awarded to Croatia and awarded by Croatia in the second semi-final and grand final of the contest, and the breakdown of the jury voting and televoting conducted during the two shows:

Points awarded to Croatia

Points awarded by Croatia

Detailed voting results
The following members comprised the Croatian jury:
  (jury chairperson)producer, arranger, composer, multi-instrumentalist
 Dino Jelusićrock singer, musician, songwriter, winner of the Junior Eurovision Song Contest 2003
 Saša Lozarsinger
 Ivana Kindlsinger, songwriter
 Sanja Doležalsinger, television host, represented Yugoslavia in the 1987 contest as part of Novi fosili

References 

2017
Countries in the Eurovision Song Contest 2017
Eurovision